One Piccadilly Gardens is a large office building on the east side of Piccadilly Gardens, a public square in Manchester city centre.

It houses six floors of office space, with shops and restaurants on the ground floor. The entrance to the offices is via a double height diagonal void through the ground and first floors of the building which links Portland Street to Piccadilly Gardens.

Construction
One Piccadilly Gardens opened in 2003 as part of the redevelopment of Piccadilly Gardens; the building was designed by Allies and Morrison and has large glazed facades behind a red brick grid.

Occupiers
Office space:
Allianz Insurance plc
BNY Mellon
Homes and Communities Agency
Jones Lang LaSalle
Ground floor:
ASK Italian
Barburrito
Byron
Pizza Express
Pret A Manger
Shoryu Ramen

References

Buildings and structures in Manchester
Office buildings completed in 2003
Piccadilly Gardens